The Porta Mariae (Latin, "Marian Gate") is a memorial arch in Naga City commemorating the tercentenary of the devotion to Our Lady of Peñafrancia.

The main portal’s two small gates each accommodate three persons, while the central portal accommodates at least eight persons.

The arch was commissioned by the Archdiocese of Cáceres, and its construction was financed by the Peñafrancia Devotees of Metro Manila Foundation Inc. with General Salvador Mison as its director. It was designed by architect Gian Paolo P. Priela and completed under the direction of engineer Noriel L. Villar. The Porta Mariae was blessed and inaugurated by Archbishop Leonardo Legaspi on 9 September 2010.

References

Triumphal arches
Cultural infrastructure completed in 2009
Neoclassical architecture in the Philippines
Monuments and memorials in the Philippines
Triumphal arches in the Philippines
Buildings and structures in Naga, Camarines Sur
Tourist attractions in Naga, Camarines Sur
Angels in art